Spike Lee is an American film director, producer, writer, and actor, known for films that deal with controversial social and political issues. Each of Lee's films is typically referred to as "A Spike Lee Joint" and the closing credits always end with the phrases "By Any Means Necessary," "Ya Dig," and "Sho Nuff."

Lee received a Master of Fine Arts from New York University's Tisch School of the Arts, which culminated in his thesis film Joe's Bed-Stuy Barbershop: We Cut Heads, the first student film to be showcased in Lincoln Center's New Directors/New Films Festival. Lee's first feature-film She's Gotta Have It was released three years later in 1986. Lee directed, produced, wrote, and acted in his first three feature-films: She's Gotta Have It, School Daze, and Do the Right Thing. Lee has starred or acted in many of his own films, including the role of Mars Blackmon, which he reprised for a series of Nike commercials that also starred Michael Jordan.

In addition to his feature-film credits, Lee has directed music videos by artists such as Prince, Michael Jackson, Anita Baker and Eminem.  He has also directed music videos for songs featured in films he has directed, including "Fight the Power" by Public Enemy, which was featured heavily in the 1989 film Do the Right Thing.

Filmography

Short films

Feature films

Documentary

Acting roles

Television

Documentary

Stage show

Acting roles

Music videos

Video games

References
General

Specific

External links

Filmography
Male actor filmographies
Director filmographies
Director videographies
American filmographies